FC Bilombé is a Congolese football club based in Republic of the Congo. They play in the Congo Premier League.

Football clubs in the Republic of the Congo